Mariza is the seventh studio album by fado singer Mariza. It was released in 2018 by Warner Music Portugal. The album peaked at No. 1 on the Associação Fonográfica Portuguesa chart and was certified as a gold album. The album received a Latin Grammy nomination for Best Portuguese Language Roots Album in 2018.

Track listing
 Trigueirinha (Jorge Fernando) [2:39]
 Quem Me Dera (Matias Damásio) [4:16]
 Amor Perfeito (Héber Marques) [3:41]
 Oração (Tiago Machado) [3:13]
 Sou (Rochedo) (Jorge Fernando) [3:30]
 É Mentira (Joao Vasconcelos) [2:57]
 Semente Viva (Mario Pacheco) [3:40]
 Por Tanto Te Amar (Diogo Clemente) [4:20]
 Nosso Tempo (Ângelo Freire) [4:39]
 Verde Limão (Arlindo DeCarvalho) [3:06]	
 Quebranto (Jorge Fernando) [4:14]
 Oi Nha Mãe (Custódio Castelo) [3:56]
 Fado Errado (Frederico de Brito) [4:25]	
 Fado Refúgio (Acácio Gomes) [3:04]	
 Trigueirinha (Jorge Fernando) [2:37]

References

Mariza albums
2018 albums
Portuguese-language albums
Warner Music Group albums